Randall Craig "Tex" Cobb (born May 7, 1950) is an American actor, martial artist, and former professional boxer who competed in the heavyweight division. Considered to possess one of the greatest boxing chins of all time, Cobb was a brawler who also packed considerable punching power. He began his fighting career in full contact kickboxing in 1975 before making the jump to professional boxing two years later. He  unsuccessfully challenged Larry Holmes for the WBC and lineal world heavyweight title in November 1982, losing by a one-sided unanimous decision. Cobb took wins over notable heavyweights of his era such as Bernardo Mercado, Earnie Shavers, and Leon Spinks. He was ranked in the global top 10 heavyweight boxers by the Ring (in 1981 and 1982) and BoxRec (in 1982).

In addition to his fighting career, he has also acted in numerous films and television series, usually appearing as a villain or henchman. Examples include roles in the Coen brothers film Raising Arizona and the popular programs Miami Vice and Walker, Texas Ranger.

Early life
Randall Cobb was born in Bridge City, Texas, the son of Norma Grace (née Alexander) and Williard Glynn Cobb, a factory foreman. He was raised in Abilene, Texas, and attended Abilene High School, where he played on the football team. Cobb later studied at Abilene Christian University, but dropped out at the age of 19, and began karate training. He lived in the dojo, cleaning the mats to earn his keep. After earning his black belt, he craved full-contact competition, thus took up kickboxing, fighting in an era when only full contact rules were used in the United States. He won his first nine matches, going 9–0 with all knockouts.

He TKO'd El Paso Golden Gloves Heavyweight Champion and karate black belt, David Ochoa, in the first-ever professional kickboxing event in El Paso, Texas, in 1975. The promoters were Robert Nava and boxing trainer Tom McKay under the guidance of boxing guru and matchmaker, Paul Clinite. Clinite signed Randall to a professional-boxing contract a few weeks later. He also signed Ochoa, who had fought amateur under the guidance of McKay as his trainer. Clinite provided films of heavyweight boxers to study to get the huge Cobb a good style. After a few days, it was decided that Randall should work at learning the "Joe Louis shuffle". Randall, Paul, and Tom spent a few months at El Paso's San Juan Boxing Gym just doing the simple basics. A few months later, Clinite made arrangements for Randall to be sent to Joe Frazier's gym in Philadelphia.

Boxing career
After nine straight wins as a kickboxer, Cobb lost his first two amateur bouts. In his professional-boxing debut on January 19, 1977, in El Paso, he knocked out Pedro Vega. He went on to win 13 straight fights by 1979, all by knockout. Cobb was a fighter who had hitting power, as shown by his eighth-round knockout victory over Earnie Shavers in 1980. He lost his two following bouts to Ken Norton and Michael Dokes, respectively, but soon bounced back to earn a shot at Larry Holmes' WBC World Heavyweight Championship. On November 26, 1982, at Houston's Astrodome, Cobb was defeated in a unanimous decision by Holmes, who won all 15 rounds on two of three scorecards. The bloody one-sidedness of the fight, which came 13 days after the bout between Ray Mancini and Duk Koo Kim that led to Kim's death four days later due to brain trauma, horrified sportscaster Howard Cosell so much that he vowed never to cover another professional match, which Cobb jokingly referred to this as his "gift to the sport of boxing."  When prodded further regarding Cosell's remarks, Cobb observed, "Hey, if it gets him to stop broadcasting NFL games, I'll go play football for a week, too!" When asked if he would consider a rematch, Cobb replied that he did not think that Holmes would agree, as "the champion's fists couldn't handle a rematch."
In an interview with Johnny Carson after the Holmes fight, Carson said "He seems to have a much longer reach than you do", to which Cobb replied, "Looked like that to you too?"

He made a brief return to kickboxing on May 5, 1984, to challenge John Jackson for the Professional Karate Association United States Heavyweight title in Birmingham, Alabama, losing on points. Between late 1984 and 1985, he lost four straight fights, the last of which was a knockout at the hands of Dee Collier, the only time he was ever KO'd. After a two-year hiatus, he made a return to the ring and went on a 20-fight undefeated streak against lightly regarded opponents (including a win over past-his-prime former champ Leon Spinks in 1988) before retiring again rather suddenly in 1993. A 1993 Sports Illustrated article alleged that Cobb had participated in a fixed fight with Sonny Barch and had used cocaine with Barch and promoter Rick "Elvis" Parker before and after the fight. Cobb said the magazine libeled him, and he sued for US$150 million. In 1999, a jury awarded Cobb $8.5 million in compensatory damages and $2.2 million in punitive damages. However, the verdict was overturned in 2002 by a federal appeals court, which said that the article was not published with "actual malice". The magazine did not interview the referee and other ringside officials who were at the match, which tends to show that the magazine "might not have acted as a prudent reporter would have acted", the ruling stated. "But the actual malice standard requires more than just proof of negligence".

Acting career
As a Hollywood actor, Cobb has played a series of villainous roles in films such as Police Academy 4: Citizens on Patrol, Blind Fury, Ace Ventura: Pet Detective, Liar Liar, The Golden Child, Naked Gun : The Final Insult, Fletch Lives, and Ernest Goes to Jail. He has made guest appearances on several television shows, including Miami Vice, Highlander: The Series, Married... with Children, Moonlighting, Walker, Texas Ranger, MacGyver (as the character Earthquake), and The X-Files.

Cobb's other appearances include the 1983 film Uncommon Valor, in which he played a rare heroic role; the 1987 movie Critical Condition, in which he plays a character in the psych ward who thinks he is a "brother" (an African American); The Champ, which referred to his boxing career by casting Cobb as a boxer who fights the title character, Billy Flynn; and Diggstown, in which he plays a prison inmate who fights at the behest of a con man. One of his more memorable roles is the menacing outlaw biker/bounty hunter Leonard Smalls in the 1987 Coen Brothers film Raising Arizona. Joel Coen later described Cobb as difficult to work with: "he's less an actor than a force of nature". On Late Night with David Letterman on January 7, 1987, he was asked how boxing compared to acting and said "In the last job I had, if you didn't do it just exactly right you got hit in the mouth. In this kind of job, the worst thing that can happen, I mean if everything in the whole world goes wrong, take two."

In 1992, he appeared in Vince Gill's music video for his song "Don't Let Our Love Start Slippin' Away". In 1993, he spoofed himself by appearing in a commercial for Old El Paso salsa.

Personal life
Cobb lives in Philadelphia, and maintained a friendship with Philadelphia Daily News columnist Pete Dexter, who frequently commented on boxing. In a notorious 1981 Grays Ferry incident, Cobb came to the defense of Dexter, who during the course of a bar brawl, was severely beaten.  Cobb rescued him and endured a broken arm, costing him a scheduled fight with Mike Weaver.

Cobb's eldest son Bo was killed in an accident in early 2001. His younger son Joshua pursued a short career as a boxer.

In January 2008, at age 57, Cobb graduated magna cum laude from Temple University with a bachelor's degree in sport and recreation management. He remarked that it was odd to hear the cheers of a packed arena without being in a boxing ring. "It was nice to have that opportunity to wear a robe, to step up there and not have to worry about bleeding", Cobb said.

Boxing record

Kickboxing record

|-  style="background:#fbb;"
| 1984-05-05 || Loss ||align=left| John Jackson || || Birmingham, Alabama || Decision || 9 || 2:00
|-
! style=background:white colspan=9 |
|-  style="background:#cfc;"
| 1983-00-00 || Win ||align=left| Anthony Elmore || || || Decision || ||
|-  style="background:#cfc;"
| 1975-04-18 || Win ||align=left| David Ochoa || || El Paso, Texas || TKO || 2 ||
|-
| colspan=9 | Legend:

Filmography

References

External links
 
 

1950 births
Living people
Abilene High School (Abilene, Texas) alumni
American male boxers
Boxers from Texas
Heavyweight boxers
American male kickboxers
Kickboxers from Texas
Heavyweight kickboxers
American male karateka
American male film actors
American male television actors
Male actors from Philadelphia
Male actors from Texas
People from Bridge City, Texas
Sportspeople from Abilene, Texas
Boxers from Philadelphia
Temple University alumni
People from Jackson County, Texas
People from Orange County, Texas